Novodina americana is a species of starfish found of the coast of Greenland. A 2018 study of deep-water starfish species found that N. americana was both bioluminescent and, unexpectedly for an inhabitant of the aphotic zone, to have eyes that have among the highest resolutions found this far among starfish.

References

Brisingida
Animals described in 1880